Monkey ball or Monkey Ball may refer to:

Plants
 Maclura pomifera, the Osage orange tree
 Liquidambar styraciflua, sweet gum tree fruit

Other uses
 Super Monkey Ball, a platform video game series
 Super Monkey Ball (video game), the first game in the series, originally an upright arcade cabinet called Monkey Ball